Zión Moreno (born February 23, 1995) is an American actress and model. She is known for her television roles in the Netflix series Control Z and the 2021 HBO Max reboot of Gossip Girl as well as her role in the film K-12, written and directed by Melanie Martinez.

Early life
Moreno was born in El Paso, Texas to Mexican parents; her mother is from Chihuahua and her father from Monterrey. She grew up in Albuquerque, New Mexico and spoke Spanish at home.

Moreno is a trans woman and began undergoing her transition while she was still in school; during this time, she faced bullying from her peers.

Career
Moreno moved to New York City at 19 to pursue a career in modeling. She was scouted by Wilhelmina, Elite, and Slay managements. She initially found modeling challenging but has grown to appreciate modeling more since shifting her focus towards acting.

She presented the Diversify TV Awards at the 2017 MIPCOM in Cannes.

Moreno made her on screen debut as Fleur in the 2019 surrealist jukebox musical film K-12. In 2020, she began starring as Isabela de la Fuente in the Mexican Netflix teen drama Control Z. In March 2020, it was announced she had been cast as Luna La in the HBO Max series Gossip Girl, a soft reboot of the original series that premiered on July 8, 2021.

Filmography

References

External links

Living people
21st-century American actors
Actors from Albuquerque, New Mexico
Actors from El Paso, Texas
American actors of Mexican descent
American television actors
Female models from New Mexico
Female models from Texas
Hispanic and Latino American actresses
Hispanic and Latino American female models
LGBT Hispanic and Latino American people
LGBT people from New Mexico
LGBT people from Texas
Transgender actresses
Transgender female models
1995 births
21st-century American women
American actresses of Mexican descent